Sergey Urusov may refer to:

 Sergey Semyonovich Urusov (1827–1897), Russian chess player
 Sergey Dmitriyevich Urusov (1862–1937), Russian politician

See also
Urusov